Ian Kehoe is an Irish journalist, writer, broadcaster and former editor of The Sunday Business Post.
Kehoe, who is from Enniscorthy in County Wexford in the south-east of Ireland, holds a degree in journalism and a masters in international relations from Dublin City University (DCU).
He worked as Business editor, and deputy editor before becoming editor of the post in 2014, he resigned in 2018. He was appointed to the board of RTÉ in 2018.
Kehoe has worked as a reporter on RTÉ's Prime Time Current Affairs show.
In 2013 along with Gavin Daly he published Citizen Quinn about the rise and fall of Sean Quinn.

In 2019, along with Tom Lyons, he launched The Currency, a business and news website.

Books
 Citizen Quinn by Gavin Daly and Ian Kehoe, Penguin Ireland, 2013.

References

Living people
Irish journalists
Irish newspaper editors
Business Post people
Alumni of Dublin City University
Year of birth missing (living people)